The Fenwicks Scrub Flora Reserve is a protected nature reserve that is located on the Mid North Coast of New South Wales, Australia. The  reserve is situated west of Port Macquarie on the Great Dividing Range. The reserve is dominated by warm temperate rainforest.

See also

 Protected areas of New South Wales

References

External links
 https://web.archive.org/web/20100802205303/http://www.unep-wcmc.org/sites/wh/pdf/Gondwana%20Forests,%20Australia.pdf

Flora reserves in New South Wales
Gondwana Rainforests of Australia
Forests of New South Wales
Mid North Coast